Instituto de Estadística y Cartografía de Andalucía (IECA) is a public organization which coordinates and announces statistics and cartography in Andalucía. In 2019 it was named Elena Manzanera Díaz as the directress.

References

History of Andalusia
Government of Andalusia
Political history of Spain
Geographic information systems organizations
Statistics education
Statistical service organizations
National statistical services of Europe